is a Japanese actor, voice actor and narrator. He is a founder of Office Kaoru.

Filmography

Television animation
Kaibutsu-kun (1968)
Kamui the Ninja (1969) (Roku)
Dog of Flanders (1975) (Hans)
Wakakusa no Charlotte (1977) (Gordon)
Anne of Green Gables (1979) (John Sadler)
Gordian Warrior (1979) (Dokuma)
Super Dimension Century Orguss (1983) (Jeffrey Wright)
Princess Sara (1985) (Old Priest)
The Story of Pollyanna, Girl of Love (1986) (Dr. Charlie Ames)
My Patrasche (1992) (Reins)
Ninku (1995) (Seishi Ninku)
Rurouni Kenshin (1996) (Takuma Hashizume)
Detective Conan (2000) (Kenzo Masuyama:Pisco)
Gilgamesh (2003) (The Manager)
One Piece (2005) (Tom)
Stitch! (2008) (Teacher (ep. 20))
Naruto: Shippuden (2010) (Iou)
Chaika - The Coffin Princess (2014) (Vemac IV)

Original video animation (OVA)
Vampire Hunter D (1985) (Mayor Roman)
Mobile Suit Gundam 0080: War in the Pocket (1989) (Chris's father)
Black Jack (1998) (Dr. Stanfield)

Theatrical animation
Mobile Suit Gundam (1981) (General Revil)
Mobile Suit Gundam: Soldiers of Sorrow (1981) (General Revil)
Mobile Suit Gundam: Encounters in Space (1982) (General Revil)
Wicked City (1987) (Black Guard President)
Doraemon: Nobita's Diary of the Creation of the World (1995) (The President)
Crayon Shin-chan: The Storm Called: The Kasukabe Boys of the Evening Sun (2004) (Mike Mizuno)
Crayon Shin-chan: Invasion!! Alien Shiriri (2017) (Mike Mizuno)

Video games
Gihren no Yabou series (1998–) (General Revil)
Atelier Annie: Alchemists of Sera Island (2009) (Bethgea)

Dubbing

Live-action
2012 (Tony Delgotto (George Segal))
About Schmidt (Larry Hertzel (Howard Hesseman))
Ace Ventura: Pet Detective (Roger Podacter (Troy Evans))
Armageddon (Ronald Quincy (Jason Isaacs))
Assault on Precinct 13 (Sgt. Jasper O'Shea (Brian Dennehy))
Asteroid (1997 TV Asahi edition) (Lloyd Morgan (Frank McRae))
Bill & Ted's Bogus Journey (1994 TV Tokyo edition) (Chuck De Nomolos (Joss Ackland))
The Boston Strangler (1973 TV Asashi edition) (Dr. Nagy (Austin Willis))
Brawl in Cell Block 99 (The Placid Man (Udo Kier))
The Cable Guy (Earl Kovacs (George Segal))
Captain America (Sam Kolawetz (Ned Beatty))
The Cave (Dr. Nicolai (Marcel Iureş))
Coupe de Ville (Fred "Pop" Libner (Alan Arkin))
Dead Silence (Edward Ashen (Bob Gunton))
DodgeBall: A True Underdog Story (The Dodgeball chancellor (William Shatner))
Duel (Café owner (Eddie Firestone))
First Blood (1995 TV Asahi edition) (Deputy Sgt. Arthur Galt (Jack Starrett))
Flash of Genius (Gregory Lawson (Alan Alda))
Goldfinger (1978 NTV edition) (Q (Desmond Llewelyn))
Good Night, and Good Luck (William Paley (Frank Langella))
The Great Escape (1971 Fuji TV edition) (Lt. Dietrich (George Mikell))
Grey's Anatomy (Thatcher Grey (Jeff Perry))
Gulliver's Travels (King Theodore (Billy Connolly))
Harry Potter and the Deathly Hallows – Part 1 (Elphias Doge (David Ryall))
Hugo (Monsieur Frick (Richard Griffiths))
I.Q. (Nathan Liebknecht (Joseph Maher))
JFK (1994 TV Asashi edition) (Russell B. Long (Walter Matthau))
Last Action Hero (2001 TV Asahi edition) (Tony Vivaldi (Anthony Quinn))
Lost (Bernard Nadler (Sam Anderson))
The Matrix Reloaded (Councillor Hamann (Anthony Zerbe))
The Matrix Revolutions (Councillor Hamann (Anthony Zerbe))
Mortdecai (Sir Graham (Michael Culkin))
National Treasure (Agent Peter Sadusky (Harvey Keitel))
National Treasure: Book of Secrets (FBI Special Agent Sadusky (Harvey Keitel))
The Omen (1979 TBS edition) (Dr. Becker (Anthony Nicholls))
Pathfinder (Pathfinder (Russell Means))
Pirates of the Caribbean: The Curse of the Black Pearl (Governor Weatherby Swann (Jonathan Pryce))
Pirates of the Caribbean: At World's End (Governor Weatherby Swann (Jonathan Pryce))
Quartet (Cedric Livingstone (Michael Gambon))
Sleepy Hollow (Baltus Van Tassel (Michael Gambon))
Sonny & Jed (1979 TV Tokyo edition) (Garcia (Eduardo Fajardo))
Texas, Adios (Pedro (Hugo Blacno))
Timecop (Commander Eugene Matuzak (Bruce McGill))
Twin Peaks (Will Hayward (Warren Frost))
Vertigo (2012 Blu-Ray edition) (Gavin Elster (Tom Helmore))
The Walking Dead (Hershel Greene (Scott Wilson))
Wall Street (1991 Fuji TV edition) (Trader (Oliver Stone))
Wild Wild West (Coleman (M. Emmet Walsh))

Animation
Curious George (Mr. Bloomsberry)
Darkwing Duck (Steelbeak)
Joseph: King of Dreams (Jacob)
Prep & Landing ('The Big Guy' Santa Claus)
ReBoot (Fuji TV edition) (Cyrus)

References

External links
 Official agency profile 
 

1933 births
Living people
Japanese male video game actors
Japanese male voice actors
Male voice actors from Tokyo